Dublin Blues is an album by the American singer-songwriter Guy Clark, released in 1995. Clark promoted the album by touring with son, Travis, as his bass player.  It has recently been remastered (2023) and an extra track has been discovered.  It will hopefully be released soon.

Production
Rodney Crowell cowrote "Stuff That Works". Nanci Griffith and Emmylou Harris contributed harmony vocals.

Critical reception

Entertainment Weekly praised the "tongue-and-groove meditations on life and love." The Salt Lake Tribune noted that "Clark can take ordinary conversation and turn it into a song—an underrated skill that's not as easy as it appears." The Indianapolis Star determined that "powerful poetic phrases, impressionable and hummable melodies, stunning storytelling and a living-room intimacy don't even come close to describing this collection."

Track listing
 "Dublin Blues" (Guy Clark) – 4:19
 "Black Diamond Strings" (Clark) – 3:49
 "Shut Up and Talk to Me" (Clark, Susanna Clark, Keith Sykes) – 3:30
 "Stuff That Works" (Clark, Rodney Crowell) – 5:04
 "Hank Williams Said It Best" (Clark) – 4:43
 "The Cape" (Clark, Susanna Clark, Jim Janosky) – 3:39
 "Baby Took a Limo to Memphis" (Clark) – 4:08
 "Tryin' to Try" (Clark, Jimmie Fadden) – 3:11
 "Hangin' Your Life on the Wall" (Clark, Verlon Thompson) – 3:30
 "The Randall Knife" (Clark) – 5:31

Personnel
Guy Clark – vocals, guitar
Sam Bush – mandolin
Travis Clark – bass
Donivan Cowart – background vocals
Rodney Crowell – guitar, background vocals
Ramblin' Jack Elliott – background vocals
Nanci Griffith – background vocals
Emmylou Harris – background vocals
Jelly Roll Johnson – harmonica
Kenny Malone – drums, percussion, conga, tambourine, triangle, shaker, bell tree, Irish drum
Kathy Mattea – background vocals
Suzi Ragsdale – background vocals
Darrell Scott – guitar, dobro, mandolin, penny whistle, slide guitar
Verlon Thompson – guitar, harmonica, background vocals
Jonathan Yudkin – violin

Production notes
Miles Wilkinson – producer, engineer, mixing
Carlos Grier – mastering
Denny Purcell – mastering
Darrell Scott – mixing
Bill Tyler – art direction, design
Senor McGuire – photography

Cover versions
Chris Carrabba covered "The Cape" on his album Covered in the Flood.

References

Guy Clark albums
1995 albums
Asylum Records albums